Mike McKay (born September 4, 1976) is a Canadian former professional ice hockey player.

Early life 
McKay was born in Bellefeuille, Quebec. He played major junior hockey in the QMJHL before attending Saint Mary's University in Nova Scotia.

Career 
McKay began his professional career with the 1999–2000 New Mexico Scorpions of the Western Professional Hockey League, extending a five-game, mid-season tryout agreement to a full season and playoffs.

McKay went on to play five seasons of professional hockey, including two seasons (2000 to 2002) with the Fort Wayne Komets of the United Hockey League, where he scored 64 goals and 46 assists for 110 points, while earning 132 penalty minutes, in 131 games played. McKay retired following the 2003–04 season during which he played 20 games in the ECHL with the Texas Wildcatters.

References

External links

1976 births
Living people
Anchorage Aces players
Anglophone Quebec people
Canadian ice hockey right wingers
Chicoutimi Saguenéens (QMJHL) players
Cincinnati Cyclones (IHL) players
Fort Wayne Komets players
Hull Olympiques players
Laval Titan players
New Mexico Scorpions (WPHL) players
San Angelo Saints players
Saint Mary's Huskies ice hockey players
Texas Wildcatters players
People from Saint-Jérôme
Ice hockey people from Quebec
Canadian expatriate ice hockey players in the United States